Alatsinainy Ambazaha is a rural municipality in Analamanga Region, in the  Central Highlands of Madagascar. It belongs to the district of Antananarivo-Atsimondrano and its populations numbers to 5,664 in 2019. 

It is situated at 16 km in the South-West of the capital Antananrivo and constituted by the villages (fokontany) of : Ambohimahamanina, Morombato, Anjanamanoro, Isoatsimeloka and Ivatobe.

Agriculture
70% of the population are farmers. Rice, manioc, sweet potatoes, beans, tomatoes and potatoes are the most grown agricultural products.

References

mg:Ampanefy

Populated places in Analamanga